This article presents a list of people whom Herodotus (c.484–c.425 BC) mentioned in Book One of his major work The Histories. Herodotus presented his theme as "recording the achievements of both our own (Greek) and other peoples; and more particularly, to show how they came into conflict". Structurally, The Histories is sub-divided into nine books, each of which is sometimes named after one of the nine Muses. The work contains numerous digressions but the theme is constant. Although Herodotus' references range from the Trojan War of the 2nd millennium BC to the Peloponnesian War in his own lifetime, the essential scope of the entire work is a record of events from the reign of Cyrus the Great (c.553–c.529 BC) to the defeat of Xerxes I in 479 BC. Book One ends with the death of Cyrus.

Some of the people named by Herodotus are legendary, or at least semi-legendary. Dates and places are given where known and notes are provided to indicate the role and/or importance played by each person in The Histories. Page numbers are those in the Burn/de Sélincourt edition published by Penguin Books in 1975, based on de Sélincourt's 1954 translation.

Key

List

Notes

Sources
 
 
 
 
 </ref>
 
 
 

Herodotus
Herodotus